A two-part referendum was held in Switzerland on 23 May 1875. A new federal law establishing and certifying civil status and marriage was narrowly approved, whilst a new federal law on suffrage was narrowly rejected.

Background
This was the first optional referendum held in the country, as all previous referendums had been mandatory referendums. Whilst obligatory referendums required both a majority of voters and a majority of cantons in favour, optional referendums required only a majority of the public vote.

Results

Federal law on the establishment of civil status and marriage

Federal law on suffrage

References

1875 referendums
1875 in Switzerland
Referendums in Switzerland